Audrey Doreen Swayne Williamson (later Mitchell) (28 September 1926 – 29 April 2010) was a British athlete who competed mainly in the 200 metres.

She competed for Great Britain in the 1948 Summer Olympics held in London, United Kingdom in the 200 metres where she won the silver medal.
She is the only female to represent the United Kingdom and to have received a medal better than a bronze in this event.

References

1926 births
2010 deaths
Athletes (track and field) at the 1948 Summer Olympics
Olympic athletes of Great Britain
Olympic silver medallists for Great Britain
British female sprinters
Medalists at the 1948 Summer Olympics
Olympic silver medalists in athletics (track and field)
Olympic female sprinters